Steven R. Monroe is an American film director and writer. His credits include the remake of the 1978 horror movie I Spit on Your Grave (2010) and its sequel I Spit on Your Grave 2 (2013). He resides in Los Angeles, California.

Films

As director
House of 9 (2005)
It Waits (2005)
 Sasquatch Mountain (2006)
Dual (2008)
Ogre (2008)
Storm Cell (2008)
Wyvern (2009)
Ice Twisters (2009)
I Spit on Your Grave (2010)
Mongolian Death Worm (2010)
Jabberwock (2011)
Complacent (2012)
12 Disasters of Christmas (2012)
MoniKa (2012)
End of the World (2013)
I Spit on Your Grave 2 (2013)
Grave Halloween (2013)
Cyber Case (2015)
The Exorcism of Molly Hartley (2015)
Christmas Tree Lane (2020)
Milliardaire ou presque (2021)
Unborn (2022)

As writer
Mongolian Death Worm (2010)
MoniKa (2012)

References

External links

American film directors
1964 births
Living people
Place of birth missing (living people)
Horror film directors